Monterey Park may refer to:

Canada
Monterey Park, Calgary, Alberta, a neighbourhood

United States
Monterey Park, California, a city in Los Angeles County in Southern California
Monterey Park Hospital
Monterey Park Tract, California,  a census-designated place in Stanislaus County, California
Monterey Park, New Mexico, a census-designated place

See also